The Shire of Tammin is a local government area in the Wheatbelt region of Western Australia. Its seat of government is the town of Tammin, about 80 kilometres (50 mi) west of Merredin and about 180 kilometres (112 mi) east of Perth, the state capital.

History
Originally the area was governed by the Meckering Road Board (now the neighbouring Shire of Cunderdin).

The Tammin Road District was gazetted on 18 June 1948. On 1 July 1961, it became a shire under the Local Government Act 1960, which reformed all remaining road districts into shires.

Wards
The Shire has never had wards, and all six councillors sit at large. The Shire President is elected from amongst the councillors.

Towns and localities
The towns and localities of the Shire of Tammin with population and size figures based on the most recent Australian census:

Population

Heritage-listed places
As of 2023, 18 places are heritage-listed in the Shire of Tammin, of which one is on the State Register of Heritage Places.

References

External links
 

Tammin